Lirularia acuticostata, common name the sharp-keeled lirularia, is a species of sea snail, a marine gastropod mollusk in the family Trochidae, the top snails.

Description
The height of the shell measures 2.5 mm and its diameter 3 mm. The small, white shell has a subglobose shape. The two nuclear whorls are, smooth. Its apex is elevated. The teleoconch contains 3 whorls, with two raised carinae on the spire and six on the body whorl. The body whorl contains about 6 equal spiral cords. The axial ribs are absent. The sutures are subrectangular. The aperture is circular. The conspicuous outer lip is little contracted. The umbilicus is not large.

Distribution
This marine species occurs off the coast of Sitka, Alaska to the southern Californian coast.

References

 A.M. Strong (1934) West American species of the genus Liotia; Transactions of The San Diego Society For Natural History vol. 7 (1934)
 Turgeon, D.; Quinn, J.F.; Bogan, A.E.; Coan, E.V.; Hochberg, F.G.; Lyons, W.G.; Mikkelsen, P.M.; Neves, R.J.; Roper, C.F.E.; Rosenberg, G.; Roth, B.; Scheltema, A.; Thompson, F.G.; Vecchione, M.; Williams, J.D. (1998). Common and scientific names of aquatic invertebrates from the United States and Canada: mollusks. 2nd ed. American Fisheries Society Special Publication, 26. American Fisheries Society: Bethesda, MD (USA). . IX, 526 + cd-rom pp. page(s): 60

External links
 To Biodiversity Heritage Library (1 publication)
 To Encyclopedia of Life
 To ITIS
 To World Register of Marine Species

acuticostata
Gastropods described in 1864